Christian fascism is a term which is used to describe a far-right political ideology that denotes an intersection between fascism and Christianity. It is sometimes referred to as "Christofascism", a neologism which was coined in 1970 by the liberation theologian Dorothee Sölle.

Interpretation of Sölle
Tom F. Driver, the Paul Tillich Professor Emeritus at Union Theological Seminary, expressed concern "that the worship of God in Christ not divide Christian from Jew, man from woman, clergy from laity, white from black, or rich from poor". To him, Christianity is in constant danger of Christofascism. He stated that "[w]e fear christofascism, which we see as the political direction of all attempts to place Christ at the center of social life and history" and that "[m]uch of the churches' teaching about Christ has turned into something that is dictatorial in its heart and is preparing society for an American fascism".

Christofascism "disposed or allowed Christians, to impose themselves not only upon other religions but other cultures, and political parties which do not march under the banner of the final, normative, victorious Christ" – as Paul F. Knitter describes Sölle's view.

Christomonism
Douglas John Hall, Professor of Christian Theology at McGill University, relates Sölle's concept of Christofascism to Christomonism, which inevitably ends in religious triumphalism and exclusivity, noting Sölle's observation of American fundamentalist Christianity which led him to conclude that Christomonism easily leads to Christofascism, and violence is never far away from militant Christomonism. (Christomonism only accepts one divine person, Jesus Christ, rather than the Trinity.) He states that the over-divinized ("high") Christology of Christendom is demonstrated to be wrong by its "almost unrelieved anti-Judaism".  He suggests that the best way to guard against this is for Christians not to neglect the humanity of Jesus Christ in favour of his divinity, and remind themselves that Jesus was also a Jewish human being.

American history and politics
Chris Hedges and David Neiwert contend that the origins of American Christofascism date back to the Great Depression, when Americans first espoused forms of fascism that were "explicitly 'Christian' in nature". Hedges writes that "fundamentalist preachers such as Gerald B. Winrod and Gerald L. K. Smith fused national and Christian symbols to advocate the country's first crude form of Christo-fascism". Smith's Christian Nationalist Crusade stated that a "Christian character is the basis of all real Americanism". Hedges also believes that William Dudley Pelley was another prominent advocate of Christofascism. Nonetheless, some historians contend the presence of Christian fascism in the Antebellum United States. 

In the late 1950s, some adherents of these philosophies founded the John Birch Society, whose policy positions and rhetoric have greatly influenced modern dominionists.  Likewise, the Posse Comitatus movement was founded by former associates of Pelley and Smith. The 1980s saw the founding of the Council for National Policy and the Moral Majority, two organizations which carried on the tradition, while the patriot and militia movements represented efforts to mainstream the philosophy in the 1990s.

Incidents of anti-abortion violence, including the Atlanta and Birmingham bombings which were committed by Eric Rudolph and the assassination of George Tiller at his Wichita, Kansas church in 2009, have also been considered acts which were motivated by Christofascism.

Usage of the term caused controversy in 2007 when Melissa McEwan, a campaign blogger for then-presidential candidate John Edwards, referred to religious conservatives as "Christofascists" on her personal blog.

Criticism of the term
Anti-war human-rights activist George Hunsinger, director of the Centre for Barth Studies at Princeton Theological Seminary, regards the very accusation of "fascism" as a sophisticated theological attack on the biblical depiction of Jesus. He believes that the view of Christ which is harmfully accused as Christofascist is in fact the real "Jesus Christ as he is depicted in Scripture". Hunsinger contrasts his preferred understanding of Jesus with the "nonnormative Christology" that self-proclaimed anti-Christofascists offer as an alternative, which he criticizes as extreme relativism that reduces Jesus Christ to "an object of mere personal preference and cultural location". Hunsinger believes that this relativism may contribute to the same problems which Karl Barth in the previous century saw in Germany's Christian church.

See also

Christian fascist movements in Europe dating to World War II
 FET y de las JONS
 German Christians
 Iron Guard
 National-Christian Defense League
 Patriotic People's Movement
 Rexism
 Ustaše

References

Further reading 
 Soelle, Dorothee (1990). "Christofascism" The Window of Vulnerability. 133-141 https://newtranscendentalist.medium.com/christofascism-by-dorothee-s%C3%B6lle-633273379b68
 Hedges, Chris (2007) "American Fascists: The Christian Right and The War on America"

External links
 
 "Christofascism," Dorothee Sölle

Christian nationalism
Christian radicalism
Christian theology and politics
Fascism